Summer Games can refer to:

 The Summer Olympic Games
 Summer Games (video game), a 1984 video game
 Summer Games II, a 1985 sequel to the above game
 Summer Games (1984 film), a 1984 Italian film
 Summer Games (2011 film), a 2011 Swiss film
 Overwatch seasonal events#Summer Games, a seasonal event appearing in Overwatch

See also
 Winter games (disambiguation)
 Games (disambiguation)